Events in the year 1873 in India.

Incumbents
Thomas Baring, 1st Earl of Northbrook, Viceroy

Events
 National income - 3,441 million
Bihar famine of 1873–74

Law
Indian Oaths Act
Government Savings Promotion Act
Government Saving Banks Act
East India Stock Dividend Redemption Act (British statute)
East India Loan Act (British statute)
Indian Railway Companies Act (British statute)
Extradition Act (British statute)
Slave Trade Act (British statute)

Births
19 December – Upendranath Brahmachari, scientist and medical practitioner (died 1946).

References

 
India
Years of the 19th century in India